is a Japanese manga artist. She debuted with Takkyu Shōjo in 1999, and writes for Ciao magazine. Her manga Mirmo! received the Kodansha Manga Award for children's manga in 2003 and the Shogakukan Manga Award for children's manga in 2004, and there is a 172-episode anime adaptation as well.

Selected works
Chenge!
Mirmo!
Koisuru purin
Chibi Devi!
PriPri Chi-chan!!

References

External links
 Profile at Ciao Magazine site 
 

1979 births
Living people
Manga artists from Fukuoka Prefecture